The ABC Afternoon Playbreak is an American television anthology series that was broadcast on ABC from 1973 to 1975.  The ninety-minute dramas aired once a month and featured some of the more popular television and film stars of the 1970s (Diana Hyland, Bradford Dillman, Patty Duke, Diane Baker, David Hedison).

Episodes
Season 1
"The Things I Never Said" (October 31, 1973)
"A Special Act of Love" (November 14, 1973)
"Mother of the Bride" (January 9, 1974)
"Miss Kline, We Love You" (February 27, 1974)
"Last Bride of Salem" (May 8, 1974)
Season 2
"Can I Save My Children?" (October 17, 1974)
"Heart in Hiding" (November 14, 1974)
"Oh, Baby, Baby, Baby..." (December 5, 1974)
"The Girl Who Couldn't Lose" (February 13, 1975)

ABC's Matinee Today
The series was preempted in December 1973 for the pilot of ABC's Matinee Today, another dramatic anthology series.  The pilot ran daily for five days, but never returned to the ABC schedule.  The five episodes are frequently listed as part of The ABC Afternoon Playbreak.

"I Never Said Goodbye" (December 3, 1973)
"The Other Woman" (December 4, 1973)
"Alone with Terror" (December 5, 1973)
"My Secret Mother" (December 6, 1973)
"The Mask of Love" (December 7, 1973)

Awards
The 14 episodes of these two related anthologies won 18 Daytime Emmy Awards and were nominated an additional 16 times.

References

External links

American Broadcasting Company original programming
1973 American television series debuts
1975 American television series endings
1970s American anthology television series
1970s American drama television series
English-language television shows